Raja Maldeo was a 15th century Chahar Jat ruler, who ruled the town of Sidhmukh in Jangladesh (Bikaner).

Jat rulers
History of Rajasthan
15th-century monarchs in Asia